The Minister for Family, Natality and Equal Opportunities (Italian: Ministro per la Famiglia, la Natalità e le Pari Opportunità) in Italy is one of the positions in the Italian government.

The current Minister for Family is Eugenia Roccella, appointed on 22 October 2022 in the Meloni Cabinet.

List of Ministers
 Parties

 Governments

References

Family
Family in Italy